Internet in Christmas Island is supplied by CiFi - Christmas Island Fibre Internet. CiFi is the first and only ISP offering services on the island provided via the Vocus ASC subsea cable system, resulting in high speed & low latency internet access for the first time. CiFi is also the only ISP with local presence & support on the island.

According to the 2016 Australian census, 78.5% of the population accessed the Internet from home.

History 
From March 2017 to October 2021, Christmas Island's Internet services were previously supplied by Speedcast, using the SES 03b MEO satellite constellation for off island backhaul. Speedcast ceased operations in Christmas Island in October 2021.

Prior to 2017, internet services were available via the Christmas Island Internet Administration Limited (CiiA), but were cut on 1 March 2017, affecting about 1000 customers' 4G and fixed wireless services. Landline and 2G services were not affected. The company stated it was forced to close because it could not compete with the National Broadband Network (NBN). CiiA lodged a complaint with the Australian Competition & Consumer Commission to stop the NBN rollout, but failed. The Department of Infrastructure and Regional Development stated the company had refused financial support.

On 14 March 2017, Speedcast announced it had reached an agreement with the Australian Government to deliver wireless and 4G services until 30 June of the same year, to allow a transition period until more NBN services were installed. Minister for Local Government and Territories Fiona Nash thanked SpeedCast for "stepping in to provide an internet service that will get Christmas Island back online."

See also
.cx - Internet domain name for Christmas Island
goatse.cx

References

Communications in Christmas Island